Long intergenic non-protein coding RNA 483 is a protein that in humans is encoded by the LINC00483 gene.

References